Off Season can refer to:

Films
Off Season (1992 film), a 1992 Swiss film
Off Season (2001 film), a 2001 TV film
Off Season (2012 film), a 2012 American film
The Off Season, a 2004 independent horror film
Offseason, a 2021 horror film by Mickey Keating

Other uses
Close season in sports
Off Season (novel), by Jack Ketchum, 1980
The Off-Season, a 2021 album by J.Cole
 "Off Season", a song by YoungBoy Never Broke Again from his 2020 album Top